Owen Lloyd Rogers (born 22 October 1958) is a South African judge who presently serves on the Constitutional Court. He was appointed to the court with effect from 1 August 2022, having previously served for nine years on the Western Cape Division of the High Court.

References

1958 births
Living people
Judges of the Constitutional Court of South Africa
South African judges
White South African people